高山, meaning "tall mountain(s)", may refer to:

Mandarin Chinese reading Gāoshān:
Gaoshanzu, the name used in the People's Republic of China to refer to Taiwan aborigines
Courtesy name of Taiwan-based 20th-century Taoist religious leader Wang Hao-te
Guqin piece by  Spring and Autumn period or Warring States period musician Bo Ya

Cantonese Chinese reading Gōusāan
Ko Shan Terrace, residential estate in Taikoo Shing, Hong Kong
Ko Shan Road Park, an urban park

Korean reading Gosan
Ko San, South Korean astronaut

Japanese kun-yomi Takayama
Takayama, Gifu, city in Gifu Prefecture, Japan
Takayama Main Line, train line running between Gifu and Toyama, Japan
Takayama, Gunma, village in Agatsuma District, Gunma Prefecture, Japan
Takayama, Nagano, village in Kamitakai District, Nagano Prefecture, Japan

Vietnamese reading Cao Sơn
 Commune Cao Son, district Anh Son, province Nghe An
 Commune Cao Son, district Bach Thong, province Bac Kan
 Commune Cao Son, district Da Bac, province Hoa Binh
 Commune Cao Son, district Luong Son, Hoa Binh province
 Commune Cao Son, district Muong Khuong, province Lao Cai.
 The names of many mountain gods in Vietnam, god Cao Sơn.

See also
 Takayama (disambiguation)